G290.1-0.8 is a supernova remnant in the constellation Carina. It is located in the Galactic plane. It is also known as MSH 11-61A.

References

Carina (constellation)
Supernova remnants